Entré is a studio album by Matz Bladhs released 23 December 2009.

Track listing
Tänd ett ljus i fönstret
Lille du
Varje steg jag tar
Du ska veta att jag saknar dig
En dag i taget
Godmorgon solsken
So Long
I Can't Stop Loving You
Personality
Tro mig
När ord inte räcker till
She's Not You

Charts

References 

2009 albums
Matz Bladhs albums
Swedish-language albums